Hema V. Bellur is an Indian actress in the Kannada film industry, and a theatre artist in Karnataka, India. Some of the notable films of Hema Bellur as an actress include Vaalee (2001), Kiladi (2000), Mysore Huli (2001) and Dumbee (2003).

Selected filmography

Career 
Apart from films she has acted in Kannada soaps/serials such as Charanadasi, Manvanthara, and Malebillu

See also

List of people from Karnataka
Cinema of Karnataka
List of Indian film actresses
Cinema of India

References

External links 

 

Hema Bellur
Actresses in Kannada cinema
Living people
Kannada people
Actresses from Karnataka
Actresses from Bangalore
Indian film actresses
21st-century Indian actresses
Actresses in Kannada television
Theatre in India
Year of birth missing (living people)